Dahinda is an unincorporated community in Key West Rural Municipality No. 70 in the province of Saskatchewan, Canada. It is located at the intersection of Township Road 82 and Range Road 233, approximately 9 km east of Kayville.

See also
 List of communities in Saskatchewan
 List of Canadian tornadoes and tornado outbreaks

References

Unincorporated communities in Saskatchewan
Key West No. 70, Saskatchewan
Division No. 2, Saskatchewan